Aston is a district of Birmingham, England.

Aston may also refer to:

Places

United Kingdom

In Birmingham
 Aston (Birmingham ward)
 Aston Hall, a mansion
 Aston railway station
 Aston Science Park
Aston Manor (UK Parliament constituency) 1885–1918
Birmingham Aston (UK Parliament constituency) 1918–1974

Elsewhere in England
 Aston, Berkshire
 Aston Abbotts, Buckinghamshire
 Aston Clinton, Buckinghamshire
 Aston Mullins, Buckinghamshire 
 Aston Sandford, Buckinghamshire
 Aston by Budworth, Cheshire (near Northwich)
 Aston-by-Sutton, Cheshire (near Runcorn)
 Aston by Wrenbury, Cheshire (south-west of Nantwich; near Audlem)
 Aston juxta Mondrum, Cheshire (north of Nantwich)
 Aston, Derbyshire Dales, Derbyshire
 Aston, High Peak, Derbyshire
 Aston-on-Trent, Derbyshire
 Aston Hall, Aston-on-Trent, former 18th-century country house in Derbyshire
 Aston Heath, Derbyshire
 Aston Blank or Cold Aston, Gloucestershire 
 Aston Magna, Gloucestershire
 Aston on Carrant, Gloucestershire
 Aston Subedge, Gloucestershire
 Aston Down, former Royal Air Force airfield in Gloucestershire
 Aston, Herefordshire, a location
 Aston Ingham, Herefordshire
 Aston, Hertfordshire
 Aston Flamville, Leicestershire
 Aston le Walls, Northamptonshire
 Aston, Oxfordshire, in West Oxfordshire
 Aston Rowant, Oxfordshire
 Aston Tirrold, Oxfordshire
 Aston Upthorpe, Oxfordshire
 Middle Aston, Oxfordshire
 North Aston, Oxfordshire
 Aston, Claverley, a location in Shropshire
 Aston, Telford and Wrekin, in the parish of Wrockwardine, Shropshire
 Aston, Wem Rural, Shropshire
 Aston Botterell, Shropshire
 Aston Eyre, Shropshire
 Aston Munslow, Shropshire
 Aston on Clun, Shropshire
 Aston Pigott, Shropshire
 Aston, South Yorkshire
 Aston, Newcastle-under-Lyme, a location in Staffordshire
 Aston, Stafford, Doxey, Staffordshire
 Aston-by-Stone, Staffordshire
 Little Aston, Staffordshire
 Aston Cantlow, Warwickshire
 Aston Somerville, Worcestershire

In Wales
 Aston, Flintshire
 Aston, Powys, a location

Other countries 
 Division of Aston, an electoral division in Victoria, Australia
 Aston Bay, Nunavut, Canada
 Aston, Ariège, France
 Aston Quay, one of the Dublin quays, Ireland
 Aston Township, Delaware County, Pennsylvania, United States
 Aston Park, Dallas, United States, a public park

Extraterrestrial 
 Aston (crater) on the Moon, named for Francis William Aston

Schools 
 Aston University, Birmingham, England
 Aston Business School
 Aston Comprehensive School, South Yorkshire, England

People
 Aston (name)

Other uses
 Aston Dark Space, the dark region between the cathode and the cathode glow in a vacuum tube
 Aston International, a hotel management company
 Aston Martin, a British manufacturer of automobiles
 Aston process, used to produce wrought iron
 Aston Villa F.C., an association football club in Birmingham, England
 Aston (band), Australian classical band who cover popular music, featured on The Matty Johns Show
 Lord Aston of Forfar, a title in the peerage of Scotland
 A synonym for the lower third, graphics on the bottom part of a television screen

See also 
 Aston Hall (disambiguation)
 Aston Park (disambiguation)
 Ashton (disambiguation)